Power station is a light rail station in Salt Lake City, Utah, served by the Green Line of the Utah Transit Authority's (UTA) TRAX system. The Green Line provides service from the Salt Lake City International Airport to West Valley City (via Downtown Salt Lake City), and connects with the rest of the TRAX system, as well as UTA's FrontRunner commuter rail and S Line streetcar.

Description 
The station is located at 1480 West North Temple Street, with the island platform in the median of the street. The Rocky Mountain Power facility is located just south of the station. Unlike many TRAX stations, Power does not have a Park and Ride lot. Like many other UTA stations, this station has artwork included in its design. The artwork for the Power station includes benches designed to resemble wind turbines. The combined work is called The Power Station and was designed by Darl Thomas of Salt Lake City. The station is part of a railway right of way that was created specifically for the Green Line. The station opened on April 14, 2013, and is operated by the Utah Transit Authority. It is also one of four TRAX stations (all of which are located at the north end of the Green Line) that is powered by solar panels located on top of the station's canopy through a project which was initially funded in part by Rocky Mountain Power.

References 

TRAX (light rail) stations
Railway stations in the United States opened in 2013
Railway stations in Salt Lake City
2013 establishments in Utah